Fernando Cônsul (born 3 May 1938) is a Brazilian footballer. He played in three matches for the Brazil national football team in 1963. He was also part of Brazil's squad for the 1963 South American Championship.

References

External links
 

1938 births
Living people
Brazilian footballers
Brazil international footballers
Place of birth missing (living people)
Association football forwards
Madureira Esporte Clube players
America Football Club (RJ) players
Valenciennes FC players
Ferroviário Atlético Clube (CE) players
Brazilian expatriate footballers
Expatriate footballers in France
Brazilian football managers
Bangu Atlético Clube managers
Ferroviário Atlético Clube (CE) managers